Abu'l-Fawaris Ahmad ibn Ali ibn al-Ikhshid was the last monarch of the autonomous Ikhshidid dynasty, which ruled Egypt, Syria and the Hejaz, from 968 to 969. However, he was a child and did not exercise actual rule, being instead under the tutelage first of the vizier Ja'far ibn al-Furat and then of his uncle al-Hasan ibn Ubayd Allah ibn Tughj. His reign ended with the conquest of Egypt by the Fatimids in summer 969.

Life 
Ahmad was the son of the third Ikhshidid ruler, Abu'l-Hasan Ali ibn al-Ikhshid, and grandson of the dynasty's founder, Muhammad ibn Tughj al-Ikhshid. When his father Ali died in January 966, he was only ten; consequently, the powerful Abu'l-Misk Kafur, who had long been the virtual ruler of the state, assumed the reins of power himself.

Ahmad succeeded to the throne after Kafur's death in April 968, but the situation in Egypt was critical: the vizier Ja'far ibn al-Furat tried to control the government, but lacked a power-base outside the bureaucracy; Fatimid agents stirred up trouble among the Bedouin; the army was divided into mutually antagonistic factions (the Ikhshidiyya, recruited by Muhammad al-Ikhshid, the Kafuriyya, recruited by Kafur, and the Saqaliba or Rum, European/Byzantine slave-soldiers); and the treasury was empty due to a series of low Nile floods that had caused famine. In the end, Ibn al-Furat was overthrown by Ahmad's uncle, al-Hasan ibn Ubayd Allah ibn Tughj, governor of Palestine. Hasan seized control of Fustat in autumn 968, and installed himself as regent. On the coinage minted during this period, Hasan's name even preceded that of Ahmad, the nominal ruler. However, after only three months, Hasan released Ibn al-Jafar, entrusted him with the governance of Egypt, and returned to Palestine.

Soon after, the Fatimids, taking advantage of the turmoil in the Ikhshidid regime, launched an invasion under Jawhar al-Siqilli. By June 969, the Fatimid army stood before Fustat. After the Ikhshidid troops failed in a last-ditch effort to stop the Fatimids, the city, and Egypt with it, surrendered. Hasan was taken prisoner, thus ending the Ikhshidid dynasty, although the last Ikhshidid loyalists under his uncle remained in control of the southern part of Syria until in turn defeated by the Fatimids in spring 970. According to the historian al-Farghani, relayed by Ibn Khallikan, Ahmad died on 13 July 987.

References

Sources
 
 
 
 
 

10th-century rulers in Asia
10th-century rulers in Africa
Ikhshidid emirs
Ikhshidids
Medieval child monarchs